Epilachna is  a genus of beetle in the family Coccinellidae, including several pest species, such as the Mexican bean beetle (Epilachna varivestis).

Species
These species belong to the genus Epilachna:

 Epilachna angusta Li, 1961 g
 Epilachna bifibra Li, 1961 g
 Epilachna borealis (Fabricius, 1775) i c g b (squash lady beetle)
 Epilachna brachyfoliata Zeng & Yang, 1996 g
 Epilachna canina (Fabricius, 1775)
 Epilachna chingjing Yu & Wang, 1999 g
 Epilachna chingsingli Yu, 2011 g
 Epilachna confusa Li, C.S., E.E. & Cook, 1961 g
 Epilachna crassimala Li, 1961 g
 Epilachna decemguttata (Weise, 1923) g
 Epilachna defecta Mulsant, 1850
 Epilachna dictyodroma Zeng, 2000 g
 Epilachna donghoiensis Hoang, 1978 g
 Epilachna dregei Mulsant, 1850 - Potato Ladybird
 Epilachna dumerili Mulsant
 Epilachna eckloni Mulsant, 1850
 Epilachna eusema (Weise, 1904)
 Epilachna fugongensis Cao & Xiao, 1984 g
 Epilachna galerucinoides Korschefsky, 1934 g
 Epilachna glochisifoliata Pang & Mao, 1979 g
 Epilachna gressitti Li, C.S., E.E. & Cook, 1961 g
 Epilachna hendecaspilota (Mader, 1927) g
 Epilachna incauta Mulsant, 1850 g
 Epilachna karisimbica Weise
 Epilachna lata Li, C.S., E.E. & Cook, 1961 g
 Epilachna longissima (Dieke, 1947) g
 Epilachna maculicollis (Sicard, 1912) g
 Epilachna magna Dieke, 1947 g
 Epilachna marginella (Fabricius, 1775)
 Epilachna marginicollis (Hope)
 Epilachna max Pang & Slipinski, 2012 g
 Epilachna media Li, C.S., E.E. & Cook, 1961 g
 Epilachna mexicana (Guérin-Méneville)
 Epilachna microgenitalia Li, 1961 g
 Epilachna mobilitertiae Li, 1961 g
 Epilachna mushana Li, C.S., E.E. & Cook, 1961 g
 Epilachna mystica Mulsant
 Epilachna ocellataemaculata (Mader, 1930) g
 Epilachna paenulata (Germar)
 Epilachna paling Yu, 2001 g
 Epilachna paralobiera Peng, Pang & Pang, 2001 g
 Epilachna quadricollis (Dieke, 1947) g
 Epilachna sauteri (Weise, 1923) g
 Epilachna sociolamina Li, C.S., E.E. & Cook, 1961 g
 Epilachna tredecimnotata (Latreille, 1833) i c g b (southern squash lady beetle)
 Epilachna undecimvariolata (Boisduval)
 Epilachna varivestis Mulsant, 1850 i c g b (Mexican bean beetle)
 Epilachna velutina (Olivier, 1808) g

Data sources: i = ITIS, c = Catalogue of Life, g = GBIF, b = Bugguide.net

References

Coccinellidae
Coccinellidae genera
Agricultural pest insects
Beetles of North America
Beetles described in 1850
Taxa named by Pierre François Marie Auguste Dejean